Highway 754 is a  primary weight, gravel surface highway in the Canadian province of Saskatchewan. 

It runs from Highway 9 to Highway 637.

Highway 754 becomes Louis Ave through the village of Rama before continuing north from its intersection with Highway 5 to its end point near Hazel Dell.

See also 
Roads in Saskatchewan
Transportation in Saskatchewan

References 

754
Rama, Saskatchewan
Buchanan, Saskatchewan